William Searle may refer to:

 William Searle (cricketer) (1796–1837), English cricketer
 William George Searle (1829–1913), British historian

See also
Billy Searle, rugby player
William Searle Holdsworth, English legal historian